Isidoro Acevedo may refer to:
 a poem by Jorge Luis Borges commemorating his grandfather Isidoro de Acevedo Laprida
 Isidoro Acevedo (communist) (1867–1952), Spanish communist